A. J. McClung Memorial Stadium is a 15,000-seat sports stadium located in Columbus, Georgia.  It was the site of football games between the Georgia Bulldogs and the Auburn Tigers from 1916 until 1958 (the Deep South's Oldest Rivalry).  The stadium now hosts the Fort Valley State–Albany State (Fountain City Classic) and the Tuskegee–Morehouse rivalry games, as well local youth football and soccer and high school football games.

The stadium was named for A. J. McClung, a former mayor of Columbus, and civil rights leader.

References

Auburn Tigers football venues
Georgia Bulldogs football venues
Sports venues in Columbus, Georgia
American football venues in Georgia (U.S. state)
Soccer venues in Georgia (U.S. state)
High school football venues in the United States
College football venues